Carl G. Zimmermann (March 26, 1918 – April 11, 2014) was an American television journalist, news anchor and World War II war correspondent. Zimmermann had the longest on-air broadcasting career in the history of the Milwaukee media market, having spent more than 50 years on television and radio in the Milwaukee metropolitan area. He spent much of his television career at WITI (Channel 6). Zimmermann joined WITI in 1959 (after a stint as an anchorman at WTVW (now WISN)) as a television reporter at the station. In 1973 he began doing investigative reports under the consumer action series "Contact 6", in which he helped viewers who wrote or called in to the station to ask him about checking out various subjects from contract disputes to fraudulent practices (that the viewers became a victim of). Zimmermann continued to do "Contact 6" reports until he retired in 1986 as WITI's director of communications; Tom Hooper succeeded him and continued "Contact 6" until his own retirement, followed by Katrina Cravy, who does the segment currently. The Milwaukee Journal Sentinel called him the "dean of broadcast news in Milwaukee."

Zimmermann, who was also known as Karl, Charles and Charley, was born in Milwaukee to German immigrant parents John Zimmermann and Katherine Hoffmann Herz, who were both married previously. He graduated from South Division High School in 1937. He had already begun his broadcasting career in high school when he took a part-time job at WEMP, which led to a full-time position with the radio station. Zimmermann enlisted in the U.S. Army in 1942 during World War II. Due to his broadcasting experience, Zimmermann became a U.S. Army combat war correspondent. Zimmermann became a regular correspondent on NBC's "Army Hour", filing reports from North Africa, Sicily, Italy (including the liberation of Rome), France and Germany during the war. He regularly worked with Eric Sevareid and Edward R. Murrow as colleagues. He was awarded the Bronze Star Medal for his reports in 1944. Zimmermann also met Gertrude Stein and Ernest Hemingway at a Parisian bar.

Carl Zimmermann died from pneumonia and heart disease at Milwaukee Catholic Home in Milwaukee, Wisconsin, on April 11, 2014, at the age of 96. He is survived by his wife, the former Doris Ann Loftis, whom he married in 1942, five children: John Zimmermann, Scott Zimmermann, Richard Zimmermann, Mary Beth Nichols and Susan Klein, three grandchildren (Jacob, Laura and David) and two great grandchildren (Jenna and Rachael).

References

1918 births
2014 deaths
American war correspondents
American television news anchors
United States Army personnel of World War II
American people of German descent
Journalists from Wisconsin
Radio personalities from Milwaukee
American male journalists
South Division High School alumni
Deaths from pneumonia in Wisconsin
American war correspondents of World War II